In geometric topology, the Clifford torus is the simplest and most symmetric flat embedding of the cartesian product of two circles S and S (in the same sense that the surface of a cylinder is "flat"). It is named after William Kingdon Clifford. It resides in R4, as opposed to in R3. To see why R4 is necessary, note that if S and S each exists in its own independent embedding space R and R, the resulting product space will be R4 rather than R3. The historically popular view that the cartesian product of two circles is an R3 torus in contrast requires the highly asymmetric application of a rotation operator to the second circle, since that circle will only have one independent axis z available to it after the first circle consumes x and y.

Stated another way, a torus embedded in R3 is an asymmetric reduced-dimension projection of the maximally symmetric Clifford torus embedded in R4. The relationship is similar to that of projecting the edges of a cube onto a sheet of paper. Such a projection creates a lower-dimensional image that accurately captures the connectivity of the cube edges, but also requires the arbitrary selection and removal of one of the three fully symmetric and interchangeable axes of the cube.

When mathematically convenient, the Clifford torus can be viewed as residing inside the complex coordinate space C2, since C2 is topologically equivalent to R4.

The Clifford torus is an example of a square torus, because it is isometric to a square with opposite sides identified. It is further known as a Euclidean 2-torus (the "2" is its topological dimension); figures drawn on it obey Euclidean geometry as if it were flat, whereas the surface of a common "doughnut"-shaped torus is positively curved on the outer rim and negatively curved on the inner. Although having a different geometry than the standard embedding of a torus in three-dimensional Euclidean space, the square torus can also be embedded into three-dimensional space, by the Nash embedding theorem; one possible embedding modifies the standard torus by a fractal set of ripples running in two perpendicular directions along the surface.

Formal definition 

The unit circle S1 in R2 can be parameterized by an angle coordinate:

 

In another copy of R2, take another copy of the unit circle
 
Then the Clifford torus is

 

Since each copy of S1 is an embedded submanifold of R2, the Clifford torus is an embedded torus in  = R4.

If R4 is given by coordinates (x1, y1, x2, y2), then the Clifford torus is given by

 

This shows that in R4 the Clifford torus is a submanifold of the unit 3-sphere S3.

It is easy to verify that the Clifford torus is a minimal surface in S3.

Alternative derivation using complex numbers 

It is also common to consider the Clifford torus as an embedded torus in C2.  In two copies of C, we have the following unit circles (still parametrized by an angle coordinate):
 
and
 
Now the Clifford torus appears as
 
As before, this is an embedded submanifold, in the unit sphere S3 in C2.

If C2 is given by coordinates (z1, z2), then the Clifford torus is given by
 

In the Clifford torus as defined above, the distance of any point of the Clifford torus to the origin of C2 is
 
The set of all points at a distance of 1 from the origin of C2 is the unit 3-sphere, and so the Clifford torus sits inside this 3-sphere.  In fact, the Clifford torus divides this 3-sphere into two congruent solid tori (see Heegaard splitting).

Since O(4) acts on R4 by orthogonal transformations, we can move the "standard" Clifford torus defined above to other equivalent tori via rigid rotations.  These are all called "Clifford tori". The six-dimensional group O(4) acts transitively on the space of all such Clifford tori sitting inside the 3-sphere.  However, this action has a two-dimensional stabilizer (see group action) since rotation in the meridional and longitudinal directions of a torus preserves the torus (as opposed to moving it to a different torus).  Hence, there is actually a four-dimensional space of Clifford tori. In fact, there is a one-to-one correspondence between Clifford tori in the unit 3-sphere and pairs of polar great circles (i.e., great circles that are maximally separated).  Given a Clifford torus, the associated polar great circles are the core circles of each of the two complementary regions. Conversely, given any pair of polar great circles, the associated Clifford torus is the locus of points of the 3-sphere that are equidistant from the two circles.

More general definition of Clifford tori 

The flat tori in the unit 3-sphere S3 that are the product of circles of radius r in one 2-plane R2 and radius  in another 2-plane R2 are sometimes also called "Clifford tori".

The same circles may be thought of as having radii that are cos(θ) and sin(θ) for some angle θ in the range  (where we include the degenerate cases  and ).

(where S(r) denotes the circle in the plane R2 defined by having center  and radius r) is the 3-sphere S3.

This torus Tθ is readily seen to have area

so only the torus T/4 has the maximum possible area of 22. This torus T/4 is the torus Tθ that is most commonly called the "Clifford torus" – and it is also the only one of the Tθ that is a minimal surface in S3.

Still more general definition of Clifford tori in higher dimensions

Any unit sphere S2n−1 in an even-dimensional euclidean space  may be expressed in terms of the complex coordinates as follows:

Then, for any non-negative numbers r1, ..., rn such that r12 + ... + rn2 = 1, we may define a generalized Clifford torus as follows:

These generalized Clifford tori are all disjoint from one another. We may once again conclude that the union of each one of these tori Tr1, ..., rn is the unit (2n − 1)-sphere S2n−1 (where we must again include the degenerate cases where at least one of the radii rk = 0).

Properties 

 The Clifford torus is "flat"; it can be flattened out to a plane without stretching, unlike the standard torus of revolution.
 The Clifford torus divides the 3-sphere into two congruent solid tori. (In a stereographic projection, the Clifford torus appears as a standard torus of revolution. The fact that it divides the 3-sphere equally means that the interior of the projected torus is equivalent to the exterior, which is not easily visualized).

Uses in mathematics 

In symplectic geometry, the Clifford torus gives an example of an embedded Lagrangian submanifold of C2 with the standard symplectic structure.  (Of course, any product of embedded circles in C gives a Lagrangian torus of C2, so these need not be Clifford tori.)

The Lawson conjecture states that every minimally embedded torus in the 3-sphere with the round metric must be a Clifford torus. This conjecture was proved by Simon Brendle in 2012.

Clifford tori and their images under conformal transformations are the global minimizers of the Willmore functional.

See also 
 Duocylinder
 Hopf fibration
 Clifford parallel and Clifford surface
 William Kingdom Clifford

References 

Geometric topology
Four-dimensional geometry